January Songs is the fifth studio album by British singer-songwriter Darren Hayman. The album comes from a one-month project undertaken by Hayman whereby each song was written and recorded throughout January 2011 and accompanied by a music video and video diaries.  A special anniversary physical release of the album was released in January 2012. A limited edition of 1500 came with sleeves individually hand-drawn by Hayman.

Collaborators included The Wave Pictures, Elizabeth Morris from Allo Darlin', Gordon McIntyre from Ballboy, Terry Edwards, DJ Downfall, Rotifer, Valentine Leys, Litoral, The Hillfields, Ghostwriter, Pete Astor, Harvey Williams and former Hefner members Jack Hayter and Antony Harding.

The album also comes with 17 hidden tracks of demos and voice notes not available on the original conception.

Track listing
 "It Was Over" – 2:36
 "Bad Technology" – 3:24
 "We're Staying In" – 2:52
 "Isle of Eigg" (Sung by Gordon McIntyre) – 2:58
 "Hold Back the Clock" – 2:02
 "Nothing at All" (Recorded live at The Lexington) – 2:01
 "Esplanade Drive" – 3:04
 "Old Man Hands" (With Terry Edwards) – 2:49
 "I Can't Control Myself" (Produced by DJ Downfall) – 3:33
 "I Know I Fucked Up" (With Elizabeth Morris) – 3:28
 "You Can't Tell Her Anything" (Recorded live at Resonance FM) – 2:54
 "My Bedroom" – 2:37
 "My Dirty Widow" – 3:27
 "Who Hung the Monkey?" (With The Wave Pictures) – 3:32
 "Britain in Bloom" (With Rotifer) – 2:49
 "Let Me Sleep" (With Jack Hayter) – 3:43
 "Arthur the Dog" – 2:57
 "The Return" – 4:09
 "No Different for Girls" (Sung by Valentine Leys) – 3:14
 "I Want to Be a Volunteer" – 4:28
 "Shh... (With Litoral) – 4:21
 "Baby, Be Good to Me" – 2:31
 "Bad, Bad, Bad, Bad Girl" (With The Hillfields) – 2:49
 "Ventriloquism" (With Ghostwriter) – 3:06
 "Forest Blues" (With Pete Astor) – 3:08
 "Let Out the Sides" – 3:46
 "I Can Keep a Secret" (With Harvey Williams) – 3:58
 I Won the Girl" (Sung by Antony Harding) – 3:24
 "My Miniature Band" – 3:47
 "We're Tired of Getting Dicked Around" (Recorded live at The Lexington) – 4:14
 "My Dream Train" – 2:58

References 

2011 albums
Darren Hayman albums